Loi Pangnao is the highest mountain of the Daen Lao Range (Loi La Range), a subrange of the Shan Hills. It is located near Mong Yawng in Shan State, Burma close to the border with China.

With a height of 2,440 m and a prominence of 1,596 m, Loi Pangnao is one of the ultra prominent peaks of Southeast Asia.

See also
List of Ultras of Southeast Asia
List of mountains in Burma

References

External links
Peakbagger Loi Pangnao, Myanmar
Google Books, The Physical Geography of Southeast Asia
Mongla base shelled by Burma Army artillery

Geography of Shan State
Mountains of Myanmar
Daen Lao Range